Hwang Jung-oh (born April 1, 1958) is a retired judoka from South Korea, who represented his native country at the 1984 Summer Olympics in Los Angeles, California. There he won the silver medal in the men's half-lightweight division (–65 kg), after having been defeated by Seoi nage in the final match. He is also the founder of Hwang's Martial Arts.

Hwang has over 30 years of teaching experience in Taekwondo and the Martial Arts, still going to classes today. He holds a 6th degree Black Belt in Taekwondo, 6th degree Black Belt in Judo, and a 7th degree Black Belt in Hapkido. He won the Silver Medal in Judo in the 1984 Los Angeles Olympics.

Hwang has taught Taekwondo, Judo, and Hapkido at the University of Tennessee at Martin, Paducah Community College and each of the Hwang's Martial Arts Academies. He has participated in many conferences on Comparative Physical Education and Sports held around the world and has an international reputation as a Martial Arts Master and Educator.  he teaches almost weekly at elementary school P.E. classes, teaches the tenets of martial arts and basic taekwondo
Hwang has also made outstanding contributions to various organizations such as: WHAS Crusade for Children, Easter Seals Center in Paducah, KY and the MDA. In 1997, Mayor Jerry Abramson of Louisville, KY proclaimed June 27 as "Hwang's Martial Arts Day" in honor of Grandmaster Hwang's contributions to the Louisville community.

Grandmaster Hwang has focused his most recent efforts in improving the lives of those in his community and the commonwealth of Kentucky. The philosophy at Hwang's Martial Arts (HMA) is "The family that kicks together sticks together." By promoting families to participate in tae kwon do and judo together, Grandmaster Hwang has not only helped many people get into better physical condition, but also improve their lives through camaraderie and discipline. Furthermore, HMA has a strong sense of charity. Each year, HMA hosts many charitable events designed to raise money for the WHAS Crusade for Children and many other charitiessuch as Norton Children's hospital.

Grandmaster Hwang is in Charge of Taekwondo classes every week night and Saturday, and helps the masters be their best.

References
  Profile
  Hwang's Martial Arts Academy
 1984 Los Angeles Summer Games Judo Event Magazine

Judoka at the 1984 Summer Olympics
Olympic judoka of South Korea
Olympic silver medalists for South Korea
1958 births
Living people
Place of birth missing (living people)
Olympic medalists in judo
South Korean male judoka
Medalists at the 1984 Summer Olympics
South Korean male taekwondo practitioners
South Korean hapkido practitioners